Gočovo is a village and large municipality in the Rožňava District in the Košice Region of middle-eastern Slovakia.

History
In historical records the village was first mentioned in 1247.

Geography
The village lies at an altitude of 435 metres and covers an area of 14.578 km².
It has a population of about 410 people.

Culture
The village has a public library and a football pitch.

Genealogical resources

The records for genealogical research are available at the state archive "Statny Archiv in Banska Bystrica, Kosice, Slovakia"

 Greek Catholic church records (births/marriages/deaths): 1818-1895 (parish B)
 Lutheran church records (births/marriages/deaths): 1711-1925 (parish B)

See also
 List of municipalities and towns in Slovakia

External links
https://web.archive.org/web/20071217080336/http://www.statistics.sk/mosmis/eng/run.html
http://www.gocovo.sk
http://www.gocovo.ou.sk
Surnames of living people in Gocovo

Villages and municipalities in Rožňava District